Acacia oxycedrus, commonly known as spike wattle, is an erect or spreading shrub which is endemic to Australia.

Description
Like most species of Acacia it has phyllodes rather than true leaves. The dark green, rigid and sharp-pointed phyllodes have three or four  prominent longitudinal veins.

Distribution
The species occurs on sandy soil in dry sclerophyll forest or heath in South Australia, Victoria and New South Wales.

Cultivation
The shrub is available commercially but can be propagated by seed scarification or using boiling water. It grows well in open sun and in a well drained position in most soil types. It is frost hardy and useful for road batters or as a screen or hedge plant that will form an impenetrable barrier.

See also
 List of Acacia species

References

oxycedrus
Flora of New South Wales
Flora of South Australia
Flora of Victoria (Australia)
Fabales of Australia